Fatehpur District is one of the 75 districts of the Indian state of Uttar Pradesh. The district covers an area of 4,152 km2. The district has a population of 2,632,733 (2011 Census). Fatehpur city is the administrative headquarters of the district. Located on the banks of the sacred rivers Ganges and Yamuna, Fatehpur was mentioned in the puranic literature. The ghats of Bhitaura and Asani were described as sacred in the puranas. Bhitaura, the site of the sage Bhrigu, was an important source of learning. Fatehpur district is a part of Allahabad division.

This district is situated between two important cities, Allahabad and Kanpur of the state Uttar Pradesh. It is well connected with those cities by train routes and roads. The distance from Allahabad is 117 km and from Kanpur is 76 km. It falls in Howrah-Delhi train route between Allahabad and Kanpur. Grand Trunk road also passes by from this city. The north boundary of the district is limited by the river Ganges and its southern boundary is the river Yamuna.

Etymology and history
Fatehpur district is named after the district headquarters town Fatehpur. According to local legends, the name is derived from a battle won by Ibrahim Shah of Jaunpur over Raja Sita Nand of Athgarhia. The name of the conqueror is sometimes given as Jalal-ud-din, the ruler of Bengal. According to another tradition, the name is traced to Fateh-mand Khan who supposedly founded the town. It is based on a fragmentary inscription found at Denda Sai, in tehsil Khaga, which mentions Fatehmand Khan, an officer of Sultan Ala-ud-din, obtained a Farman from him in 1519 A.D. Confusion arises from the fact that in 1519 A.D. there was no king of the name, Ala-ud-din, and the title of the Sultan must be wrong even if the date is correct. Also Denda Sai is about 48 km. from Fatehpur.

In the 18th century the district formed a part of the subah of Korah, and was under the government of the wazir of Awadh. In 1736 it was captured by the Marathas, who retained possession of it until, in 1750, they were ousted by the Pathans of Fatehpur. In 1753 it was reconquered by the nawab of Awadh. In 1765, by a treaty between the East India Company and the nawab, Korah was made over to the Delhi emperor, who retained it until 1774, when it was again restored to the nawab wazir. Finally in 1801, the nawab, by treaty, reconveyed it to the Company in commutation of the amount which he had stipulated to pay in return for the defence of his country. In June 1857 the district rebelled, and order was established after the siege of Lucknow.

Demographics

According to the 2011 census Fatehpur district has a population of 2,632,733 roughly equal to the nation of Kuwait or the US state of Nevada. This gives it a ranking of 154th in India (out of a total of 640). Its population growth rate over the decade 2001-2011 was 14.05%. Fatehpur has a sex ratio of 901 females for every 1000 males, and a literacy rate of 67.43%. Scheduled Castes made up 24.75% of the population.

At the time of the 2011 Census of India, 97.48% of the population in the district spoke Hindi and 2.49% Urdu as their first language. The local dialect is Awadhi.

Sub-districts 

The district is divided into 3 sub-districts (tehsils)-
 Fatehpur
 Bindki
 Khaga

These sub-districts are further divided into 13 development blocks:-
 Airayan
 Amauli
 Asothar
 Bahua
 Bhitaura
 Devmai
 Dhata
 Haswa
 Hathgam
 Khajuha
 Malwan
 Telyani
 Vijayipur

Korari:
is a very important place from the archaeological viewpoint. This place has two brick temples, having amazing carving on the outer faces. The temple is tilted in its own axis about 4°. Every panel has a different design.

Bhitaura:
This block headquarters is situated at the bank of holy river Ganges. This is the place where renowned saint Bhrigu worshipped for a long time that's why called Bhrigu Thaura. Here, the flow of river Ganges is towards the north, which is very important from the religious point of view.

Ghazipur: 
This is a very large and ancient town which have a lot of historical accounts. Gandhiji, Indira Gandhi, Syam Lal Gupta ‘Parsad’, Hema Malini, Chinese traveller Huan Tsuang, Raj Babbar, Mayawati, Mulayam Singh Yadav, Rajesh Pilot, Sushma Swaraj, Jagdambica pal, etc. visited here. Paina Quila (Fort), Ghazipur Quila (Fort; now it's converted into Police station), Dargah, Tuglaki Maszid (Mosque), Murchaura (Battlefield) are few monuments. Mevati muhalla, Kanchanpur, Puranathana, Premnagar, Subhas Market, Purani bazaar, Chauk, and Dera are areas here.

Dhata:
The statue of Ravana make Dhata as a well known town of District. It's being said that this is statue is one of the most attractive statue. The temple of 'Dadua' in Kabraha add more spice in the beauty of the town. Dhata is located at the end of Fatehpur district consisting 12 Purva's. There are total number of 4 banks Bank of Baroda, Baroda UP Bank, co-operative bank and State Bank of India along with 3 ATM's. Suryakund Pakka Talab is one of the most known place of Dhata. The famous shops like Mushir Medical store, Nadan Sweet House, Shriram Sweets (Mahaveer), Dada Mini Bazaar, Kesharvani Vastralay and so on.

Notable people
 Sohan Lal Dwivedi, poet born in the Khutila-sijouli village of Bindki sub-division
 Ganesh Shankar Vidyarthi, independence activist, born in Hathgaon
 Rani Rajendra Kumari, Noted Freedom Fighter, in the 1958 by-election she defeated the UP Chief Minister CB Gupta from Maudaha¹¹.
 Niaz Fatehpuri (1884–1966), Urdu writer and poet
 V. P. Singh (1931–2008), the 7th prime minister of India; was elected to Parliament from Fatehpur (Lok Sabha constituency)
Ranvendra Pratap Singh (1964–present), State Minister of Agriculture, Government of Uttar Pradesh.

Transport

Roadways
Fatehpur is fairly well connected to other parts of Uttar Pradesh and India with national and state highways. The National Highway 19 (NH19) passes through Fatehpur. Fatehpur is 70 km from Kanpur, 117 km from Allahabad and state capital Lucknow is 137 km away. There are frequent buses to Kanpur, Allahabad, Banda, and Lucknow.

Fatehpur is a historic region in the context of the Great Indian Mutiny of 1857.

Railways
This city is connected with important cities by train. Fatehpur Station is on the main route of New Delhi-Howrah. Trains are available frequently. It has the longest platform of any station on the route from Howrah to Delhi. This fact is disputed as the shortest platforms are Jhansi (not on Delhi-Howrah route) followed by Dehri-on-Son (on Delhi-Howrah route). "As a matter of fact, the longest platform in India is Gorakhpur (Yes, it's longer than Kharagpur)."& The Chauri Chaura goes to Gorakhpur, Uttar Pradesh.

On 10 July 2011, a derailment near Malwan killed 70 passengers, and injured at more than 300.

Air
The nearest airport is Kanpur Airport which is 69.6 km from Fatehpur. It is also accessible from Prayagraj airport (124 km) which has flights to more cities than Kanpur airport.

References

External links

 Fatehpur district official website
 Site dedicated to Bundelkhand Kesri, who had family ties to Fatehpur

 
Districts of Uttar Pradesh